Burnabbie or Burnabbie Station is a defunct pastoral lease that once operated as a sheep station.

The station has existed since before 1941. The owners in that year were brothers H.E. and A.J. Carlisle, who disposed of their stock and enlisted in the army.

The ruins of the old homestead are found along the road from the highway to the Eyre Bird Observatory in the Nuytsland Nature Reserve.

See also
List of ranches and stations

References

Pastoral leases in Western Australia
Goldfields-Esperance
Stations (Australian agriculture)
Nullarbor Plain